Eoproetus is an extinct genus of ptychopariid trilobite in the family Ptychopariidae. It lived what is now China during the Cambrian Period, which lasted from approximately 539 to 485 million years ago.

References

Cambrian trilobites
Ptychopariidae